Women's Slalom World Cup 1991/1992

Final point standings
In Women's Slalom World Cup 1991/92 all results count. Vreni Schneider won her third Slalom World Cup.

External links
fis-ski.com

World Cup
FIS Alpine Ski World Cup slalom women's discipline titles